SC Fürstenfeldbruck is a German association football club from Fürstenfeldbruck, Bavaria.

History
The club was established in 1919 as Fußball Club Fürstenfeldbruck. The team is part of a sports club which, apart from football, also offers its members badminton and table tennis.

SCF did not make an impact on the Bavarian football scene until 1970, when it earned promotion to the Landesliga Bayern-Süd (IV). It took out a championship in this league in its first season there and advanced to the Amateurliga Bayern (III). The next six seasons, the team played at this level, with a fifth place in 1972 as its best performance. After relegation in 1976, the club spent three season trying to regain its Bayernliga status, finishing second in the first two attempts before winning the Landesliga in 1980.

In 1981 the club made its only appearance in DFB-Pokal (German Cup), going out in the opening round. It also achieved its best-ever league result in 1980–81, finishing third. Success was short-lived and the year after, the team was relegated once more. Returning to the Bayernliga in 1985, the club spent another three seasons at this level. Its 1987–88 performances ranks as one of the worst in the league, earning eight points out of 32 games, finishing last and returning to the Landesliga.

The club was handed down to the Bezirksoberliga Oberbayern the year after and took four seasons to recover from this drop. Back in the Landesliga from 1993 onwards, it spent another nine seasons before regaining its Bayernliga status. They regularly earned upper table results there until 2007 when a poor 17th-place finish saw the club sent down to the Landesliga Bayern-Süd (V).

At the end of the 2011–12 season the club qualified for the promotion round to the newly expanded Bayernliga and managed to return to this level after victories over SC Eintracht Freising and SV Pullach. In this league the club lasted for only one season before suffering relegation back to the Landesliga. Another relegation followed in 2015–16, now to the Bezirksliga.

Honours

League
 Landesliga Bayern-Süd
 Champions: (4) 1971, 1980, 1985, 2002
 Runners-up: (2) 1978, 1979
 Bezirksoberliga Oberbayern
 Runners-up: 1993, 2004‡
 Bezirksliga Oberbayern-Nord
 Champions: 1970
 Bezirksliga Oberbayern-Süd
 Champions: 2003‡

Indoor
 Bavarian indoor championship
 Winners: (2) 1984, 1999

 ‡ Reserve team

Recent managers
Recent managers of the club:

Recent seasons
The recent season-by-season performance of the club:

SC Fürstenfeldbruck

SC Fürstenfeldbruck II

With the introduction of the Bezirksoberligas in 1988 as the new fifth tier, below the Landesligas, all leagues below dropped one tier. With the introduction of the Regionalligas in 1994 and the 3. Liga in 2008 as the new third tier, below the 2. Bundesliga, all leagues below dropped one tier. With the establishment of the Regionalliga Bayern as the new fourth tier in Bavaria in 2012 the Bayernliga was split into a northern and a southern division, the number of Landesligas expanded from three to five and the Bezirksoberligas abolished. All leagues from the Bezirksligas onwards were elevated one tier.

DFB Cup appearances
The club has qualified for the first round of the German Cup just once:

References

Sources
Grüne, Hardy (2001). Vereinslexikon. Kassel: AGON Sportverlag

External links
 Official website  
 SC Fürstenfeldbruck at Weltfussball.de  
 Das deutsche Fußball-Archiv  historical German domestic league tables

Football clubs in Germany
Football clubs in Bavaria
Association football clubs established in 1919
Football in Upper Bavaria
1919 establishments in Germany
Fürstenfeldbruck (district)